The Sagemont School is a private preparatory school in Weston, Florida, United States operated by the for-profit Spring Education Group.

Overview
The Sagemont School operates two campuses in Weston. The Sagemont Lower School Campus serves students in PreKindergarten to Grade 5; the Sagemont Upper School Campus serves Grade 6 to 12.

Lower School
The lower school is located adjacent to Weston Town Center. The school houses the grades PreK-fifth Grade. The campus features 2 playgrounds, a 
red top basketball court, a swimming pool, an indoor basketball court/gymnasium, and a soccer field. There are 3 classroom buildings as well as an annex across the street, an art room, cafeteria, science lab, library, and administration offices.

Upper School
The upper school is located at the end of Glades Circle in Weston. The school house grades sixth-twelfth grade. The campus features a weight training room, black box theatre, and an indoor basketball court/gymnasium. There is one two story classroom building, administration offices, and an arts building behind the school. The two story building features two science labs, and a student run coffee shop known as Pride Rock Café.

History
The Sagemont School began in 1996 as a private elementary school, and later expanded to include middle school students. When the Sagemont Lower School opened its new facility in 1996, an annex across the street housed the middle school. In 1996, The Sagemont Upper School was opened, housing both Middle and High School students.

Ownership
The Sagemont School is owned by Spring Education Group and operated by The Sagemont Corporation.

Notable alumni
 Jeff Coby, professional basketball player
Egor Koulechov (born 1994), Israeli-Russian basketball player for Israeli team Ironi Nahariya
 Fab Melo (1990-2017), Brazilian professional basketball player
 Carlos Pena Jr., actor and singer
 Sebastian Yatra, Colombian singer and songwriter

External links

References

Educational institutions established in 2000
High schools in Broward County, Florida
Private middle schools in Florida
Private high schools in Florida
Private elementary schools in Florida
Preparatory schools in Florida
Weston, Florida
2000 establishments in Florida